Siemianowo  is a village in the administrative district of Gmina Łubowo, within Gniezno County, Greater Poland Voivodeship, in west-central Poland.

History 
In early August 1944, officials in this village informed the German authorities about the planned Kraków Uprising.

References

Siemianowo